Manuel Rivera may refer to:

 Manuel Rivera (painter) (1927–1995), Spanish painter 
 Manuel Rivera Garrido (born 1978),  Peruvian football player
 Manuel Rivera-Ortiz (born 1968), Puerto Rican photographer